The Basel Thaler was a currency denomination worth 3 livres or 30 batzen used by the Swiss Canton of Basel until 1798. It was used by both the Canton and the Bishopric of Basel.

Basel's basic currency unit was the livre (later franc or frank), divided into 10 batzen or 40 kreuzer. It was worth th the French silver écu or 6.67 g fine silver.

The French écu was also equivalent to 4 Franken of the Helvetic Republic, and afterwards to 4 Basel franken.

Coins
The first Thaler were issued between 1542 and 1552 by the city of Basel, together with  Thaler between 1542 and 1548.

The Bistum (Bishopric) issued silver Thaler for the first time in 1596. Bishop Wilhelm Rinck von Baldenstein (1608–1628) issued  Thaler in 1623,  Thaler in 1625 and 1 Thaler in 1624 and 1625. Bishop Johann Konrad II (1705–1737) issued  Thaler in 1717 and 1 Thaler in 1716. These were the last Thaler-denominated coins issued by the Bishopric of Basel.

References

External links

Modern obsolete currencies
Currencies of Switzerland
History of Basel
Basel-Stadt
1798 disestablishments